The 1868 York by-election was a by-election held in England on 14 February 1871 for the House of Commons constituency of York. It was held due to the resignation of the incumbent Liberal MP, Joshua Proctor Brown Westhead.  It was won by the unopposed Liberal candidate George Leeman.

References

1871 in England
Elections in York
1871 elections in the United Kingdom
By-elections to the Parliament of the United Kingdom in North Yorkshire constituencies
Unopposed by-elections to the Parliament of the United Kingdom in English constituencies
19th century in York
February 1871 events